Diamond Hill Reservoir (also known as the Pawtucket Upper Reservoir) is a reservoir in Cumberland, Providence County, Rhode Island near Diamond Hill.

It impounds the Abbott Run waterway for municipal drinking water. Both dam and reservoir are owned and operated by the city of Pawtucket's Water Supply Board.

Immediately adjacent to the south is the Arnold Mills Reservoir.

References 

Cumberland, Rhode Island
Dams in Rhode Island
Reservoirs in Rhode Island
United States local public utility dams
Buildings and structures in Providence County, Rhode Island
Lakes of Providence County, Rhode Island